Karl Link (born 27 July 1942) is a German racing cyclist. Together with his teammates he won the gold medal in the team pursuit at the 1964 Summer Olympics in Tokyo and the silver medal at the 1968 Summer Olympics in Mexico City.

External links
 
 
 

1942 births
Living people
German male cyclists
Olympic gold medalists for the United Team of Germany
Olympic silver medalists for West Germany
Cyclists at the 1964 Summer Olympics
Cyclists at the 1968 Summer Olympics
Olympic cyclists of the United Team of Germany
Olympic cyclists of West Germany
German track cyclists
Olympic medalists in cycling
People from Herrenberg
Sportspeople from Stuttgart (region)
Cyclists from Baden-Württemberg
Medalists at the 1964 Summer Olympics
Medalists at the 1968 Summer Olympics